Dogbones was a Lithuanian rock band, which existed from 1995 to 1998.

History
Dogbones was formed in Vilnius in 1995 by Sidas (Rimvydas Hopas), Marksas (Žilvinas Maigys), and drummer Teo (Teodoras Valatkevičius). The trio soon built up an underground following, and became noticed by the local independent label Zona for their energetic and lively punk/grunge sound. This led to their first release, a split-MC with fellow local band Marichuana . In 1996, promising female singer Giedrė Kilčiauskienė joined the band and Mykolas Gudelis replaced Teo on drums. In the end of 1996, Dogbones recorded their second, and the last, album "323". Same year band performed in a legendary Lithuanian rock festival Roko Maršas 

Due to a continuing lack of interest from national record companies and radio stations, and also a decline in Lithuanian public interest in alternative rock, Dogbones split up in 1998. Later they were reborn as Dyvai.

Band members
Sidas - vocals, guitar
Sla- guitar
Giedrė - vocals
Marksas - bass guitar
Sprindys- bass guitar, vocals
Teo - percussion
Mykolas - percussion

Musical groups established in 1995
Lithuanian rock music groups
Music in Vilnius